Andrew Guthrie (born 18 January 1961), previously Andrew Merryweather, is a former Australian rules footballer who played with Fitzroy and Essendon in the Victorian Football League (VFL). He used his step father's surname Merryweather during his playing career, then later changed back to his birth name.

A Doncaster recruit, he made his only appearance for Fitzroy in the 1982 VFL season, against Melbourne at Waverley Park. He got another chance to play VFL football six seasons later, when he was called up by Essendon, having spent the previous years playing local football. Used as a defender, he appeared in the first five rounds of the 1988 season.

His sons, Cameron Guthrie and Zac Guthrie play for Geelong.

References

1961 births
Australian rules footballers from Victoria (Australia)
Fitzroy Football Club players
Essendon Football Club players
Living people